Euryschema is a monotypic moth genus of the family Erebidae. Its only species, Euryschema tricycla, is known from Queensland, Australia. Both the genus and species were first described by Turner in 1925.

References

Calpinae
Moth genera